Yan Huiqing (Wade–Giles: Yen Hui-Ch'ing, (also Weiching Williams Yen or simply W.W. Yen) 顏惠慶 (2 April 1877 – 24 May 1950) was a Chinese diplomat and politician who served under the Qing Dynasty, the Republic of China and the People's Republic of China. He held the title of jinshi in the imperial bureaucracy. Notably, he served briefly as Premier and later President of the Republic of China in the 1920s, and, shortly before his death, became a member of the National Committee of the Chinese People's Political Consultative Conference.

Biography
A native of Shanghai and a graduate of the University of Virginia (where he studied political science, received prizes and medals for debate, and was elected to Phi Beta Kappa), he taught English at St. John's University, Shanghai for a short time after coming back from the United States, where he became a Freemason, and then went to Beijing to start his political career.  In 1906, he became an editor at the Commercial Press, received a D.Litt. from the Peiyang University (now Tianjin University) and the title of jinshi in the imperial civil service, and was appointed to the Imperial Ministry of Education.

He served as Foreign Minister, premier (and acting premier) five times and as acting president during his last premiership in 1926.  Wu Peifu handpicked him for the acting presidency to pave the way for Cao Kun's restoration, and he set up a cabinet in anticipation, but he was unable to take office due to Zhang Zuolin's objection.  When Yan finally took his post, he immediately resigned and appointed navy minister Du Xigui as his successor.

A veteran diplomat, he was China's first ambassador to the Soviet Union, and a delegate to the Washington Naval Conference and the League of Nations; he also served as a diplomat to Germany, Sweden, Denmark, and, finally, the United States, where he denounced the Japanese invasion of Manchuria. During World War II, he translated and compiled Stories of Old China in Hong Kong while under Japanese house-arrest in 1942. In early 1949 he visited Moscow and met with Joseph Stalin, in hopes of negotiating a solution in the Chinese Civil War.

After the founding of the People's Republic of China in 1949, he congratulated Mao Zedong on his victory, became a member of the National Committee of the Chinese People's Political Consultative Conference and he was also appointed Vice Chairman of the East China Military and Political Committee.

On May 24, 1950, Yan Huiqing died of heart disease in Shanghai at the age of 73. Mao Zedong and Zhou Enlai both sent condolences. He was survived by his wife and six children.

References

External links 
 

1877 births
1950 deaths
Presidents of the Republic of China
Premiers of the Republic of China
Ambassadors of China to the Soviet Union
Republic of China politicians from Shanghai
Ambassadors of the Republic of China to the United States
Chinese autobiographers
Writers from Shanghai
Permanent Representatives of the Republic of China to the League of Nations
University of Virginia alumni
Members of the 1st Legislative Yuan